The Apostolic Vicariate of the Comoros Archipelago is a tiny Latin apostolic vicariate (missionary pre-diocesan jurisdiction) of the Roman Catholic Church in the Indian Ocean between insular Madagascar and continental Africa, comprising the Comoros and Mayotte, with a church in each.

The see is at Moroni, Comoros on Grande Comore island. It is exempt, i.e. directly subject to the Holy See, not part of any ecclesiastical province.

History 
On 5 June 1975, the Holy See established an Apostolic Administration of Comoros on the present territory, which was split from the Diocese of Ambanja (on Madagascar), whose former last apostolic vicar and then first bishop was appointed to the new missionary post.

On 1 May 2010, it was promoted as Apostolic Vicariate of the Comoros.

Incumbent Ordinaries 
To date, all incumbents have been missionary members of three Latin congregations:

 Apostolic Administrators of Comoros
 Léon-Adolphe Messmer, Capuchins (O.F.M. Cap.) (1975.06.05 – 1980.05.02), formerly bishop of Ambanja
 Father Jean Berchmans Eugène Jung, O.F.M. Cap. (1980.05.02 – 1983)
 Pro-administrator Father Jean Péault, Paris Foreign Missions Society (M.E.P.) (1988–1991; see below)
 Pro-administrator Father Gabriel Franco Nicolai, O.F.M. Cap. (1991–1997)
 Pro-administrator Father Jean Péault, M.E.P. (see above; 1997–1998)
 Father Jan Szpilka, Salvatorians (S.D.S.) (1998.04.01 – 2006.06.06)
 Father Jan Geerits, S.D.S. (2006.06.06 – 2010.05.01)

 Apostolic Vicars of Comoros
 Charles Mahuza Yava, S.D.S. Titular Bishop of Apisa Maius (2010.05.01 – ...)

References

External links 
 Giga Catholic

Christian organizations established in 1975
Apostolic vicariates
Roman Catholic dioceses in Africa
Catholic Church in the Comoros
Catholic Church in Mayotte
Mamoudzou